Rabbitson Crusoe is a 1956 Warner Bros. Looney Tunes short directed by Friz Freleng. The short was released on April 28, 1956, and stars Bugs Bunny. The name and part of the story is a direct parody of Robinson Crusoe. A shark character of the film was intended as a parody of Moby-Dick, and is depicted as the nemesis of Yosemite Sam for two decades. Towards the end of the film, a tsunami sinks the islands inhabited by the characters.

Plot
Yosemite Sam has been shipwrecked on a small island for 20 years, and with the ship's supplies used up, the only food source is a coconut tree on an adjacent island. But crossing between the islands is difficult because of a man-eating shark named Dopey Dick (a parody of Moby-Dick), who persistently tries to catch Sam. However, Sam has gotten used to the wily shark's ways and keeps a few bludgeoning weapons on the islands in hand to drive him off.

At first, Sam enjoys eating coconuts and drinking coconut milk, but at some point he finally snaps and gets tired of having to feed on coconuts for two decades. Right at that moment, Bugs Bunny, himself shipwrecked, drifts by. When Sam calls out to him, Bugs paddles towards the island, only to be immediately put into Sam's cooking pot. As smart as ever, Bugs douses the flame with water from the pot, so Sam has to go back to his ship to get another match. However, by the time he gets back from the ship, Bugs has left the pot, which is now occupied by the shark, who nearly eats Sam until the latter manages to whack him into flight with a mallet.

Bugs has retreated to the shipwreck, singing the song "Secret Love", from where he taunts Sam. The latter tries first to reach him with a surfboard, only to be driven back by the shark. Then, he tries hanging from a balloon, only to be savaged by the shark once again after Bugs lets him sink into the flooded cargo hold. As Bugs tries to leave the ship, Sam catches him and puts him back into the pot. Just then, however, a huge tidal wave hits the islands, sinking them along with the ship. Bugs, adrift inside the pot, is soon joined by Sam fleeing from Dopey Dick again. Bugs strikes a deal with him: in return from keeping him out of the shark's reach (by a gaff's length), Sam has to paddle them both 2,736 miles (4,403 km) towards San Francisco.

Home media
Rabbitson Crusoe has been released on the Warner Home Video laserdisc Wince Upon A Time, the VHS release Bugs Bunny's Hare Raising Tales, and the DVD release Looney Tunes: Parodies Collection. In 2020 the cartoon was released uncut and digitally restored as part of the Bugs Bunny 80th Anniversary Collection Blu-ray.

See also
Looney Tunes and Merrie Melodies filmography (1950–1959)
List of Bugs Bunny cartoons
List of Yosemite Sam cartoons

References

External links

 
 

1956 films
1956 animated films
1956 short films
1950s Warner Bros. animated short films
Looney Tunes shorts
Films set in the Pacific Ocean
Films set on islands
Films based on Robinson Crusoe
Films based on Moby-Dick
Films based on multiple works
Short films directed by Friz Freleng
Films scored by Milt Franklyn
Bugs Bunny films
Yosemite Sam films
Films produced by Edward Selzer
Films about sharks
Films about tsunamis
1950s English-language films